Emrys Pugh Roberts (born November 1931) is a former Welsh nationalist political activist.

Roberts studied at Cathays High School in Cardiff and then University College Cardiff.  He joined Plaid Cymru in his youth, and stood for the party in numerous parliamentary elections, without ever being elected: the 1956 Newport by-election, Cardiff North at the 1959 general election, the 1960 Ebbw Vale by-election, then Cardiff North again in 1964.  He was also active in the Campaign for Nuclear Disarmament, serving for a while as secretary of its Welsh national council.

Roberts served as Organising Secretary for Plaid from 1957, then in 1960, became its General Secretary, serving for four years.

In 1964, Roberts left politics to take a prominent civil service job, but he quit this in 1972 to stand as the party's candidate in the Merthyr Tydfil by-election.  He took a strong second place with 37% of the vote, providing hope for the party that they would gain seats in the next general election.  He stood again in Merthyr Tydfil in the February and October 1974 general elections, gradually losing vote share.  However, he was elected to Merthyr District Council, where he led the group of Plaid councillors.  Under the leadership of Roberts, in 1976, Plaid took control of the council, the first authority it had ever run.  They retained control until 1979.

In 1979, Roberts was elected as Vice President of Plaid, serving until 1981.

In 2016, Roberts supported Brexit and subsequently wrote regular letters to the  Western Mail in support of leaving the European Union.

References

1931 births
Living people
Councillors in Wales
Politicians from Cardiff
Plaid Cymru politicians